Oriens gola, the common dartlet, is a butterfly of the family Hesperiidae. It is found from Sri Lanka and India (Kumaon, Sikkim, Assam) to Burma, Thailand, Vietnam, Peninsular Malaysia, Borneo and Sumatra. The habitat consists of sunny glades and clearings in secondary forests and plantations. It is also found along roadsides, riverbanks and other sheltered grassy habitats at elevations up to 400 metes.

The wingspan is about 22–27 mm. Adults are dark chocolate brown with amber-coloured bands on both fore- and hindwings.

The larvae feed on Imperata and Paspalum species, as well as Ottochloa nodosa. They are whitish dorsally, suffusing into pale green below. The head is pale yellowish green.

Subspecies
Oriens gola gola
Oriens gola nipata (Fruhstorfer, 1911) (Sumnba)
Oriens gola pseudolus (Mabille, 1883) (Vietnam)
Oriens gola yunnana Lee, 1962

References

 Oriens gola pseudolus in archive

Hesperiinae
Butterflies of Indochina
Butterflies described in 1877